Strong Island is an American 2017 true-crime documentary film directed by Yance Ford.

Synopsis
The film centers on the April 1992 murder of Ford's brother William, a 24-year-old African-American teacher in New York, who was killed by Mark P. Reilly, a 19-year-old white chop shop mechanic. An all-white grand jury in Suffolk County declined to indict his killer, who claimed self-defense.

Release and reception
The film premiered at the 2017 Sundance Film Festival. Worldwide rights were acquired by Netflix. It received a Gotham Independent Film Award for Best Documentary in 2017 and was nominated for the 2018 Academy Award for Best Documentary Feature. It was also nominated for an Emmy in Exceptional Merit in Documentary Filmmaking that year.

It received generally positive reviews from critics. Inkoo Kang of TheWrap said the film "is a demanding, wrenching watch; an important work." Bilge Ebiri of The Village Voice said the film is "truly special, especially as it moves towards its final act... the film is unflinching in its portrayal of their devastation after the loss of their eldest son."

References

External links
Official website
 
 
Interview with Roger Ebert

2017 documentary films
Netflix original documentary films
American documentary films
Documentary films about crime in the United States
Danish documentary films
Films scored by Hildur Guðnadóttir
2017 films
Primetime Emmy Award-winning broadcasts
2010s American films
Films set in Long Island